Luti may refer to:

 Luti Fagbenle, British actor and businessman
 Benedetto Luti (1666–1724), Italian painter
 Margarita Luti (fl. 16th century), mistress and model of Raphael
 William J. Luti, American Senior Director for the National Security Council 
 Psychrobacter luti, a species of bacterium first isolated from Antarctic environments

Latin-language surnames
Italian-language surnames
Patronymic surnames